Charles Whittingham (1664–1743) was an Anglican priest.

Whittingham was educated at Trinity College, Dublin. He received the degree of Doctor of Divinity (DD). He was Archdeacon of Dublin from 1719 until his death. During his tenure St Peter, Dublin was united perpetually to the archdeaconry.

Notes 

1743 deaths
1664 births
18th-century Irish Anglican priests
Alumni of Trinity College Dublin
Archdeacons of Dublin